The Ligue des contribuables was an organization arguing for the repeal of the income tax in France, mostly active in the 1930s. It was founded by Jules Roche as early as 1899. The organization strongly opposed the official establishment of the income tax in 1914. Roche compared the income tax to a "civil war" waged on the French population.

References

Taxation in France
Income taxes
Tax resistance in France
1899 establishments in France
1930s in France